Pakistan Civil Aviation Authority (PCAA) is a state-owned autonomous body under the administrative control of the Secretary to the Government of Pakistan for Aviation, which oversees and regulates all aspects of civil aviation in Pakistan. PCAA's head office is situated in Terminal-1 of Jinnah International Airport in Karachi. PCAA is a member state of the International Civil Aviation Organization. Nearly all 44 civilian airports in Pakistan are owned and operated by the PCAA. Air Marshal (Retd.) Asim Suleiman was appointed to head the PCAA as its Director General on 27 November 2015.

Organizational structure 
Civil Aviation Authority has been transformed into following divisions:

 Regulatory Division
 Airports & Operations Division
 Support Division

CAA JOBS 2023

Aircraft Accident Investigation Board 
Aircraft Accident Investigation Board (AAIB), working under Ministry of Aviation Division Government of Pakistan is responsible for civil aircraft's accidents and serious incidents investigation. In this role, the AAIB investigates and reports on aviation accidents and incidents. The investigation board is based in Rawalpindi near Benazir Bhutto International Airport (BBIAP). It has one regional office located in Karachi near Jinnah International Airport (JIAP).

Functions 

PCAA not only plays the role of aviation regulator but at the same time performs the service provider functions of air navigation services and airport services. The core functions of PCAA are, therefore, 'Regulatory', 'Air Navigation Services' and 'Airport Services'. These core functions are fully supported by various corporate functions of the organization.

Air traffic

Pakistan's airspace is divided into two flight information regions (FIRs).

Karachi Flight Information Region
Lahore Flight Information Region

Air crash investigations
The Aircraft Accident Investigation Board held following the air crash investigations on direction of the federal Government of Pakistan.

PIA Flight 688 on 10 July 2006
Airblue Flight 202 on 28 July 2010
JS Air Flight 201 on 5 November 2010
Bhoja Air Flight 213 on 20 April 2012
PIA Flight 661 on 7 December 2016
PIA Flight 8303 on 22 May 2020 (investigation ongoing)

Recognition
According to Service Performance Survey (SPS), a recent survey conducted by Singapore Airlines, the Allama Iqbal International Airport in Lahore is ranked the world's leading airport in terms of service performance out of 18 airports from around the world, including Dubai Airport, Cape Town Airport, Mumbai Airport and Campbeltown Airport (UK) for its good terminal services and effective management.

Islamabad International Airport is the first and only airport in Pakistan capable of handling the world's largest passenger airliner Airbus A380.

Major traffic flows by airport

Islamabad International Airport
Jinnah International Airport
Allama Iqbal International Airport

Training
Civil Aviation Training Institute (CATI), Hyderabad works under the Civil Aviation Authority. CATI is accredited by the International Civil Aviation Organization (ICAO) and is member of ICAO Trainair programme. The institute was established in 1982 to fulfill training requirement of Pakistan Civil Aviation Authority and that of the fellow countries of the region.

The Civil Aviation Training Institute provides training in the disciplines of:
Air Traffic Services
Electronics Engineering
Communication Operations
Aviation Management & Administration
Rescue and Fire Fighting Services
Electromechanical Engineering

Fake licenses scandal
Ghulam Sarwar Khan addressed Pakistan's National Assembly stating 262 pilots in the country "did not take the exam themselves" and had paid someone else to sit it on their behalf, according to CNN, and added "they don't have flying experience". This accounts for 30% of Pakistani civilian pilots not capable of flying commercial aircraft. The investigation was the preliminary report into a plane crash that killed 97 people in the southern city of Karachi on 22 May.

On 30 June, the European Union Aviation Safety Agency (EASA) revoked PIA's 'third part authorisation', subsequently banning PIA from flying in European airspace for 6 months from the following day, following multiple safety failings.

Pakistan Civil Aviation Regulatory Authority 
A delinking process to distribute Civil Aviation Authority (CAA) into two separate divisions regulatory and service divisions has been started. The new division would be called Airport Services of Pakistan (ASP).

Pakistan Airports Authority 
The authority will be bifurcated into Pakistan Civil Aviation Regulatory Authority and the Pakistan Airports Authority as per National Aviation Policy 2019.

See also

Airports Security Force
Allama Iqbal International Airport
Civil Aviation Training Institute
Islamabad International Airport
Jinnah International Airport
List of airlines of Pakistan
List of airports in Pakistan
Pakistan International Airlines
Pakistan Meteorological Department

References

External links
Civil Aviation Authority of Pakistan 

Aviation organisations based in Pakistan
Pakistan
P
Regulatory authorities of Pakistan
1982 establishments in Pakistan
Government agencies established in 1982
Civil aviation in Pakistan